, better known as , is a Japanese model, actress, tarento, and fashion designer represented by Space Craft.

Filmography

TV series

TV series

Films

References

External links
 

Japanese female models
Japanese television personalities
Japanese fashion designers
1975 births
Living people
Actresses from Kanagawa Prefecture
Models from Kanagawa Prefecture
People from Kawasaki, Kanagawa
People from Kanagawa Prefecture
Japanese women fashion designers